Chromosome 6 open reading frame 62 (C6orf62), also known as X-trans-activated protein 12 (XTP12), is a gene that encodes a protein of the same name. The encoded protein is predicted to have a subcellular location within the cytosol.

Gene and Transcript 
In the DNA, C6orf62 is 12,529 base pairs long and is located at 6q22.3. It is located on chromosome 6 on position 22.3 (6q22.3). The mature mRNA sequence is 2498 base-pairs long with 5 exons and 4 intronic regions that translates a protein that is 229 amino acids long and two predicted isoforms of 160 amino acids and 200 amino acids.

Protein 
The main transcript is 229 amino acids long and is encoded from 5 exonic regions. There exists two transcript variants that are 200 amino acids and 160 amino acids long. There is a domain of unknown function (DUF4566) present in all three variants and spans positions 1–226 on the main transcript. The molecular weight of C6orf62 is 27.1 kDa and its isoelectric point is at a pH of 9.24. It is located subcellularly localized throughout the cytosol.

Protein Interactions

Expression 
C6orf62 is broadly expressed within the human body, however, its protein abundance is not high. It is more heavily expressed in the gallbladder and testis, but it is not predicted to be expressed in the smooth muscle, lymph nodes, the spleen, ovaries, adipose tissue, and soft tissue.

Homology 
C6orf62 is highly conserved among vertebrates and has orthologs found in invertebrates.

Orthologs in Select Mammals

Orthologs in Select Ray-Finned Fish

Orthologs in Select Amphibians

Orthologs in Select Reptiles

Orthologs in Select Birds 

Orthologs in Select Invertebrates

References